Apeiron: A Journal for Ancient Philosophy and Science is a peer-reviewed academic journal on ancient philosophy. It covers research in the area of ancient Greek and Roman philosophy and science, up to the end of the classical period (roughly the seventh century CE).

Notable articles (ordered by date of publication) 

 "A New Stoicism," by Brad Inwood (2011).
 "Socratic Metaphysics?" by Nicholas D. Smith (2014).
 "Lunar Composition and Lunar Light in Stoic Philosophy," by Pinto Rhodes (2017).
 "The Soul’s Tomb: Plato on the Body as the Cause of Psychic Disorders," by Douglas R. Campbell (2022).

See also 
List of philosophy journals

References

External links 
 

Quarterly journals
Multilingual journals
Publications established in 1966
Ancient philosophy journals
De Gruyter academic journals